The men's 1500 metres race of the 2013–14 ISU Speed Skating World Cup 3, arranged in the Alau Ice Palace, in Astana, Kazakhstan, was held on 29 November 2013.

Denis Yuskov of Russia won the race, while Koen Verweij of the Netherlands came second, and Zbigniew Bródka of Poland came third. Joey Mantia of the United States won the Division B race.

Results
The race took place on Friday, 29 November, with Division B scheduled in the afternoon session, at 15:48, and Division A scheduled in the evening session, at 19:46.

Division A

Division B

References

Men 01500
3